Pusarla Venkata Ramana is a former professional volleyball player and an employee of Indian Railways in Secunderabad. He was a member of the India men's national volleyball team. In the 1986 Asian Games, he was part of the team that won a bronze medal. He was awarded the Arjuna Award in 2000 for his contribution to Indian volleyball.

Ramana was born in Nirmal. In an interview with Radha Krishna on the Telugu television channel ABN Andhra Jyothi, he said that his father died when he was five years old and that he grew up in Hyderabad with his siblings. He pursued graduation (equivalent to a bachelor's degree) in Vijayawada. His forefathers are from the West Godavari district.

Family
Ramana's wife Vijaya has also been a national-level volleyball player. Like him, she is an employee of Indian Railways. Their elder daughter, P. V. Divya, is a doctor by profession and played netball at the national level. Their younger daughter, P. V. Sindhu, is a badminton player who is a two-time Olympic medallist, having won a silver medal at the 2016 Rio Olympics and a bronze medal at the 2020 Tokyo Olympics, and a World Champion, having won the gold in the 2019 BWF World Championships. Like her father, Sindhu is also an Arjuna Awardee, as well as a recipient of the Major Dhyan Chand Khel Ratna, Padma Shri and Padma Bhushan.

References

Indian men's volleyball players
Recipients of the Arjuna Award
Volleyball players from Telangana
Living people
Year of birth missing (living people)
Asian Games medalists in volleyball
Volleyball players at the 1986 Asian Games
Medalists at the 1986 Asian Games
Asian Games bronze medalists for India